Steve Alleyne (28 January 1960 – 15 October 2007) was a Scottish cricketer, who played for Scotland in List A cricket.

References

External links
 Player profile at CricketArchive

1960 births
Barbadian cricketers
Scotland cricketers
2007 deaths